is located in the Daisetsuzan Volcanic Group of the Ishikari Mountains, Hokkaidō, Japan.

It sits within Daisetsuzan National Park and overlooks the town of Sounkyo.

See also
 List of volcanoes in Japan
 List of mountains in Japan

References

 Geographical Survey Institute

Mountains of Hokkaido
Volcanoes of Hokkaido
Lava domes